Randy Michaels Caballero (born September 27, 1990) is a Nicaraguan American professional boxer in the Bantamweight division. Caballero is a former IBF Bantamweight world champion. He lost his title on the scales after being 5 pounds overweight before a scheduled mandatory defence against Lee Haskins.

Amateur career
Caballero is a nine-time amateur champion, which includes a win at the 2008 U.S. National Amateur Champion, with an amateur record of 167-10. He also won a Bronze medal at 2006 Cadet World Championships in Istanbul, Turkey and he missed out on the 2008 Olympic qualifying because he was too young.

Professional career
On March 25, 2010 Caballero won his professional debut against Gonzalo Nicolas.

In July 2011, Caballero beat the undefeated Alexis Santiago to win his first title, the WBC Youth Intercontinental Super Bantamweight Championship.

IBF World bantamweight title
On October 25, 2014, he defeated Stuart Hall in Monte Carlo to claim the vacant IBF bantamweight title.

Professional boxing record

Caballero vs. Garcia 
On 5 February 2016, Caballero fought and defeated Ruben Garcia via a seventh round TKO.

Caballero vs. De La Hoya 
On 16 September 2017, Caballero fought Diego De La Hoya. De La Hoya won the fight convincingly on the scorecards, 100-90, 98-92 and 98-92.

Professional boxing record

See also
List of world bantamweight boxing champions

References

External links

Randy Caballero - Profile, News Archive & Current Rankings at Box.Live

 

|-

|-

1990 births
Living people
American male boxers
American boxers of Latin American descent
American people of Nicaraguan descent
People from Coachella, California
Boxers from California
World bantamweight boxing champions
Winners of the United States Championship for amateur boxers
International Boxing Federation champions